Aïn El Turk is a district in Oran Province, Algeria, on the Mediterranean Sea. It was named after its capital, Aïn El Turk.

Municipalities
The district is further divided into 4 municipalities:
Aïn El Turk
Mers El Kébir
Bousfer
El Ançor

 
Districts of Oran Province